Blattella is a genus of cosmopolitan and wild cockroaches in the family Ectobiidae.

Species 
The Catalogue of Life lists the following:

References

External links
 
 

Cockroaches
Cockroach genera